SPINA-GBeta is a calculated biomarker for pancreatic beta cell function. It represents the maximum amount of insulin that beta cells can produce per time-unit (e.g. in one second).

How to determine GBeta

The index is derived from a mathematical model of insulin-glucose homeostasis. For diagnostic purposes, it is calculated from fasting insulin and glucose concentrations with:

.

[I](∞): Fasting Insulin plasma concentration (μU/mL)
[G](∞): Fasting blood glucose concentration (mg/dL)
Dβ: EC50 for glucose at beta cells (7 mmol/L)
G3: Parameter for pharmacokinetics (58,8 s/L)

Validity 

SPINA-GBeta significantly correlates with the M value in glucose clamp studies and (better than HOMA-Beta) with the two-hour value in oral glucose tolerance testing (OGTT), glucose rise in OGTT, subscapular skinfold, truncal fat content and the HbA1c fraction.

It has the additional advantage that it circumvents the HOMA-blind zone, which renders the calculation of HOMA-Beta impossible if the fasting glucose concentration is 3.5 mmol/L (63 mg/dL) or below. Unlike HOMA-Beta, SPINA-Beta can be sensibly calculated in the whole range of measurements.

See also 
 SPINA-GR
 SPINA-GD
 SPINA-GT
 Homeostatic model assessment
 QUICKI

Notes

References

External links
 Functions for R and S for calculating SPINA-GBeta and SPINA-GR. (Permanent DOI)

Diabetes
Endocrinology
Human homeostasis
Endocrine procedures
Static endocrine function tests